Edgaras Stanionis (born 24 February 1988) is a professional Lithuanian basketball player. He plays for shooting guard position.

References 

Living people
1988 births
Lithuanian men's basketball players
Shooting guards
Basketball players from Kaunas
Universiade medalists in basketball
BC Lietkabelis players
Universiade bronze medalists for Lithuania
Medalists at the 2011 Summer Universiade